Spindle assembly abnormal protein 6 homolog (SAS-6) is a protein that in humans is encoded by the SASS6 gene.

Function 

SAS-6 is necessary for centrosome duplication and functions during procentriole formation; SAS-6 functions to ensure that each centriole seeds the formation of a single procentriole per cell cycle.

Clinical significance 

Mutations in  SASS6 are associated to MCPH.

References

Further reading